Stadice is a village and administrative part of Řehlovice in Ústí nad Labem District in the Ústí nad Labem Region of the Czech Republic. It was the home of the legendary ruler Přemysl the Ploughman.

Sights
Stadice has a ruined 14th-century Gothic Castle, as well as nearby Royal field with the monument to Přemysl the Ploughman.

References

External links
 Photos and panoramas of the Přemysl's monument

Neighbourhoods in the Czech Republic
Villages in Ústí nad Labem District